José Rómulo Sosa Ortiz (17 February 1948 – 28 September 2019), known professionally as José José, was a Mexican singer and actor. Born into a family of musicians, José began his musical career in his early teens playing guitar and singing in serenade. He later joined a jazz and bossa nova trio where he sang and played bass and double bass.

José José found success as a solo artist in the early 1970s. Demonstrating his tenor vocal ability with a stunning performance of the song "El Triste" at a Latin music festival held in Mexico City in 1970, he climbed the Latin charts during that decade. Having achieved recognition as a balladeer, his singing garnered universal critical acclaim from musical peers and media.

In the 1980s, after signing with Ariola Records, José rose to international prominence as one of the most popular and talented Latin performers. His 1983 album Secretos has sold over twenty-five million units. With many international hits, he received several Grammy nominations and recognition worldwide. He sold out in venues such as Madison Square Garden and Radio City Music Hall. His music reached non-Spanish-speaking countries like Japan, Israel and Russia. He forged a career as an actor, starring in movies such as Gavilán o Paloma (1985) and Perdóname Todo (1995).

Also known in the entertainment world as El Príncipe de la Canción (The Prince of Song), his performance and vocal style have influenced many Latin pop artists in a career that spanned more than four decades.

Due to his vocals and popularity, José José was considered by Latin audience and media as an icon of Latin pop music and one of the most emblematic and best Latin singers of all the times. Beloved by his fans in Mexico and abroad, his death was marked by many difficulties and grudges among his children, including the fact that his body wasn't readily available to be seen. .

Life and career

1948–1962: Childhood 
José Rómulo Sosa Ortiz was born on 17 February 1948 in Clavería, Azcapotzalco, Mexico City. His father, José Sosa Esquivel, was an operatic tenor (tenor comprimario) and his mother, Margarita Ortiz, was a classical pianist. When José showed interest in singing, they tried to discourage him claiming that it was too difficult to be successful in show business. In that time, his reportedly alcoholic father abandoned the family forcing José to work to help his mother and younger brother.

1963–1969: Beginnings as singer 
At the age of fifteen, his mother gave him his first piano. Besides working in his teens, he learned to play guitar and sang in the church and in serenades along with his neighborhood friends for extra money.

In 1967, at the age of 19, José formed Los Peg, a Mexican band of bossa nova/jazz. Although they made several recordings as a group, their songs were not successful. In 1965, under the name of "Pepe Sosa", pursuing a solo career encouraged by his mother, he recorded the singles "Ma vie" and "El Mundo" without success. He made a breakthrough with his artistic career when he was invited to perform a song for a friend's sister on her birthday. His friend's sister was the executive secretary for the managing director of Orfeón Records. He joined his first name "José" with his father's first name - also José - who died of alcoholism. He signed a contract with RCA Victor and recorded his first album: José José (also known as Cuidado). The album featured songs by Rubén Fuentes and Armando Manzanero. It was arranged by his former teacher Mario Patrón, who was considered the best jazz musician of Mexico, and employed Brazilian percussionist Mayuto Correa, who was in Mexico City playing with bossa nova stars João Gilberto, Carlos Lira, Leny Andrade and Tamba Trio. The album's sound is a combination of boleros and romantic ballads with a jazz and bossa nova influence. The quality of his debut album garnered praise from critics but did not achieve much popular success.

1970–1980: "El Triste", consolidation and Ariola Records 
In early 1970 he released the song "La nave del olvido" which became his first big hit in Mexico and Latin America, and recorded his second album: La Nave Del Olvido. José's big break came on 15 March 1970, when he represented Mexico in the international song festival the II Festival de la Canción Latina (Latin Song Festival II, predecessor of the OTI Festival) with a performance of the song "El Triste". Although José José finished in third place, his performance helped launch his music career to a wider audience.

José José had several major hits in the 1970s including "De Pueblo en Pueblo", "Hasta Que Vuelvas",  "Déjame Conocerte", "Sentimientos", "Paloma", and "Gavilan o Paloma". One song which was played on the radio, "El Príncipe" ("The Prince"), earned the artist the title "El Príncipe de la Canción" ("The Prince of Songs") from a DJ.

In 1973, Frank Sinatra listened to José's music at Reprise Records and invited him to record a duet and a full album under Sinatra's label. The collaboration was impossible due to José's exclusivity agreement with his label.

In 1976, José signed with Ariola Records with Reencuentro being the first albums to released under the label a year later.

1980–1989: International stardom, Secretos and Mexico's top singer 
José José released several successful albums including Amor Amor (1980), Romántico (1981), Gracias (1981), Mi Vida. The former album sold over 1.5 million copies in Latin America. He recorded the Spanish version of the hit "New York, New York", as a tribute to friend Frank Sinatra.

In 1983, José José released Secretos, in which he collaborated with Manuel Alejandro for the album's compositions. "Lo Dudo" ("I Doubt It") and "El Amor Acaba" ("The Love is Over") were major hits from the album and Secretos became the bestselling recording in his career with four million copies sold. Secretos was nominated for Best Latin Pop Performance in the Grammy Awards of 1985.  Following the release of Secretos, José continued the international success. He released Reflexiones in 1984. The album was written, produced and arranged by Rafael Pérez-Botija and sold over 2 million copies worldwide. Reflexiones  became the first album to reach number-one on the Billboard Latin Pop Albums in the United States upon its establishment in 1985 and was also nominated for Best Latin Pop Performance in the 1986 Grammy Awards.

In 1985, José José collaborated performers such as Plácido Domingo, Julio Iglesias, Roberto Carlos, José Luis Rodríguez "El Puma", Pedro Vargas and Vicente Fernández for the charity single, "Cantaré, cantarás". He also performed a duet with Puerto Rican singer José Feliciano on the song "Por Ella" ("For Her") on Feliciano's album Ya Soy Tuyo (1985) which was also nominated in the same category on the 1986 Grammy Awards. The same year, José starred in his autobiographic film Gavilán o Paloma, alongside Christian Bach and the comedian Jorge Ortiz de Pinedo. The following, he released the album Promesas, written, produced and arranged by Pérez-Botija. Its main hits were "Amantes", "Me vas a echar de menos", "Más", and "Tú me estás volviendo loco". One of the album's singles, "Pruébame", was nominated for Best Latin Pop Performance at the 1987 Grammy Awards. Promesas became his second number-one album on the Billboard Latin Pop Albums. On his next album Siempre Contigo in 1986 he worked with the Spanish producer and guitarist Paco Cepero. The album produced three singles: "¿Y Quién Puede Ser?", "Corre y Ve Con Él", and "Sin Saber". The former track became his first number-one song on the Billboard Hot Latin Songs chart in the United States. It was nominated for Best Latin Pop Performance in the Grammy Awards of 1988 and became his third number-one album on the Billboard Latin Pop Albums chart.

José José told magazine Selecciones that during 1985 to 1987, he had a personal crisis because "my life was going on airplanes, trucks, locked in a hotel room." His daughter was born in 1982 and that more or less balanced his marriage, but after a while he divorced his then wife. In the same year, he also finished his work relation with his manager, who also was his brother in law. During this events, and his on-going battle with alcoholism, José José recorded his album Soy Así; it became his fourth number-one album on the Latin Pop Albums chart. The album included four singles: the title track (became his second number-one song on the Hot Latin Songs chart), "Mi Hembra", "Salúdamela Mucho", and "Vergüenza Me Da Quererte".  Soy Así was nominated for Best Latin Pop Performance in the 1989 Grammy Awards. It was also nominated for Pop Album of the Year at the 1st Annual Lo Nuestro Awards in the same year while José José was awarded Pop Male Artist of the Year.

José José played the role of the Mexican singer and composer Álvaro Carrillo in the movie Sabor A Mí, co-starring Angelica Aragón. In 1989, José José released ¿Qué Es El Amor? and included three singles: "Como Tú", "Piel de Azucar" and "Él". "Como Tú" spent ten weeks at number-one on the Hot Latin Songs chart and received a nomination for Pop Song of the Year at the 1990 Lo Nuestro Awards.

1990–1999: "Amnesia", 40 y 20, rehab and decline 
In 1990, Raúl Velasco made a special TV show to celebrate José's 25th career anniversary. The show, broadcast by Televisa, lasted over five hours and featured special guests such as Armando Manzanero, Libertad Lamarque, Vicente Fernández and Marco Antonio Muñiz. Later that year, he released En las Buenas... y en las Malas with the lead single "Amnesia" reaching number-one on the Hot Latin Songs chart. Two years later, he released 40 y 20 in which the title track speaks about men who fall in love with women that are much younger than them and the reaction of the society to those situations.

By the early 1990s, José's vocals began to deteriorate. It worsened over time and became evident in his live performances. His excessive drinking and unceasing activity of his career caused his voice to falter.

In August 1993, to commemorate the 30th anniversary of José's career, BMG hosted a tribute in the city of Puerto Vallarta. It was called 30 Años de ser el Príncipe (30 years of being the Prince). The tribute included some of the most prestigious artists of Spanish music such as Rocío Dúrcal, Camilo Sesto, Armando Manzanero, Marco Antonio Muñiz and Raúl di Blasio. The tribute coincided with his recent divorce, a serious relapse into alcoholism and a significant loss of vocal abilities. He appeared to be in poor physical shape, too thin and lacking energy. Camilo Sesto even took a break in the middle of the presentation to speak words of encouragement. The album was not released until 1994. At that time, José suffered the worst stage of alcoholism of his life. During 1993, he retired from the stage and went into rehab. Upon completion of his rehabilitation, he started seasons in places like the famous "Teatro Blanquita" of Mexico City, and the Gibson Amphitheatre in Los Angeles, among others.

In 1994, José José reunited with Manuel Alejandro and released the album Grandeza Mexicana. The title track peaked at number 12 on the  Hot Latin Tracks. He recorded a duet with his son José Joél in the song "La Fuerza de la Sangre". In 1995, he played the lead role in the movie Perdóname Todo, a drama about an alcoholic has-been and how he tries to survive against himself and the music business. That same year, his album "Mujeriego" was released. It sold more than 180,000 copies in its first two weeks and reached number 12 on the Billboard Latin charts. The song "Llora Corazón" peaked at number 6 on the Hot Latin Songs and was nominated for Pop Song of the Year in the Lo Nuestro Awards.

In 1996, he performed a duet with Paul Anka on "Déjame Conocerte (Let me Get to Know You)" from Anka's Latin album Amigos. In 1997, he performed at the Bally's Atlantic City.  In September 1999, he joined fellow Mexican singers Armando Manzanero, Marco Antonio Muñiz and Argentine pianist Raúl di Blasio for a series of concerts dubbed "Noche Bohemia" (Bohemian Night) at the Universal Amphitheatre in Los Angeles.

2000–2012: Vocal problems, TV and Sony BMG concept albums 
In 2001, with a deteriorating voice he recorded Tenampa. It was his first studio album with mariachi and the last one of his career. It was written and produced completely by Juan Gabriel. It received poor reviews and sold only about 500,000 units. After that, he retired from recording full-length albums. His vocal problems worsened, affecting not only his ability to sing, but also to speak. In 2003, BMG released a collection of three albums entitled El Principe Con Trio with some of his greatest hits recorded between 1969 and 1983, separated from the original accompaniment, remastered and accompanied by the guitar trio "Los Tres Caballeros", transforming them into boleros.

In the mid-2000s, he played the role of Erasmo Padilla (the father of Leticia "Lety" Padilla) in La Fea Más Bella, a successful Mexican version of the Colombian production Betty la Fea (adapted in the US as Ugly Betty). In 2007, he won a TVyNovelas Award for best supporting actor for his work in La Fea Más Bella.

In 2008, José recorded an emotive song called "Volver a creer" ("Believe Again") with Greek composer Yanni. The song is included on the album Yanni Voices. Yanni stated that he wanted to "help a true legend to fulfill his dream, to sing again". José José was invited by Yanni to sing their song live on Yanni's tour in Mexico. He published his autobiography Esta es mi vida (This is My Life).

In 2010, he released José José Ranchero, another concept album with some of his greatest hits, separated from the original accompaniment, remastered and accompanied with mariachi, giving his classics a traditional Mexican sound. The same year, José launched his own perfume, called simply "José José", the profits from sales help women and children sick with HIV/AIDS.

José was planning a new, untitled album, adding that it would consist of nine unreleased tracks and a melody he used to sing in serenades "Que viva mi tristeza", from songwriter Armando Manzanero. It was never completed due to his vocal problems. In 2011, he went on the short Mexican tour "José José y sus amigos" (José José and friends), with singers Dulce, Carlos Cuevas, Celso Piña, and Chamin Correa.

In 2012, as a celebration for his 50-year career, José gave a concert at the Hard Rock Hotel & Casino in Miami,  his final live performance.

Personal life

Alcoholism 
José said that he started drinking at the age of fifteen, when his father (an alcoholic) left home. As a result of his alcoholism, he developed a cocaine habit.

He stated that his addiction was because he "was frail, weak, innocent, ignorant, weak-willed and did not know how to say no". In the early 1970s, after the success of "El Triste" and missing a collaboration with Frank Sinatra, he fell into depression and alcoholism, but with help of his friends and family he managed to stop drinking for a while. His ongoing battle against alcoholism continued during the 1970s and 1980s. He attended AA meetings and stopped drinking for periods of time, but fell steadily back into the addiction. After his divorce from Anel in 1991 he reached his lowest point, reportedly declaring that he wanted to die drinking. With the help of his friends, family and fellow artists, he decided to go to rehab. He went to the Hazelden clinic in Minnesota for rehab and remained a sober recovering alcoholic.

Financial problems
In later years, José made his financial problems public. Despite being one of the most recognized Latin artists for decades, his alcoholism caused him serious monetary loss. His career declined when he lost his vocal ability, stopping income from live performances. He claimed that during his career he was constantly defrauded by people close to him, including his former wife Anel and her brother. In November 2008, his wife suffered a cerebral haemorrhage, José stated that the medical bills nearly caused him to go bankrupt. He told TV Notas magazine that he and his family lived "day to day" and in 2014, he sold his five-million-dollar house in Coral Gables, Florida, and moved to an apartment in Miami.

Health issues
José José suffered from a severe case of pneumonia in 1972 and his thoracic diaphragm was paralyzed. The disease almost ended his career. He recovered after months of therapy involving breathing exercises. One of his lungs was permanently damaged. In 1987, he underwent an operation at the Cedars-Sinai Medical Center to remove nodes in his vocal fold as a consequence of the excessive use of cortisone before singing, alcohol use, and the lack of rest after many of his performances. José would suffer dire consequences from his problem with alcoholism, as his health faltered dearly during the 1990s. He developed diabetes.

The effects of alcoholism, the abuse of cortisone, and his hiatus hernia not only affected his ability to sing but to talk, as well. In 2007, he suffered from Bell's palsy. As a result of all these problems, he fought a serious depression. He acknowledged this during an interview on the Univision program Don Francisco Presenta..., hosted by Don Francisco. He struggled with diabetic retinopathy in one of his eyes undergoing a successful operation. In 2012, he underwent surgery due to gastritis. In November 2013, he underwent an operation to remove cataracts from one of his eyes.

Relationships, marriages and family 
In 1970 he started a relationship with TV hostess, actress, and model Ana Elena Noreña, known in show business as Anel. That year they split and he married Natalia "Kiki" Herrera Calles, a socialite 20 years older. He separated from Herrera and returned to Anel shortly after. He divorced Herrera in 1975 and married Anel in 1976. They had two children: their first-born José Francisco (known as José Joél) who was born in 1975, and their daughter Marysol Estrella, born in 1982. In 1991 he divorced Anel. Four years later, he married Sara "Sarita" Salazar, his third wife. The same year during a Latin American tour, his third child Sara was born. He lived in Miami, Florida, with his wife.

Illness and death

In March 2017, José José announced he had been diagnosed with pancreatic cancer. On 28 September 2019, although it was not entirely confirmed since an autopsy was not performed, José José presumably died of the disease at the Homestead hospital in Homestead, Florida at 12:17 p.m., at the age of 71.

His death shocked Mexico and within several hours became a national trending topic. A large number of personalities, artists, athletes and politicians mourned his death in social media. President of Mexico Andrés Manuel López Obrador stated that "his voice moved a lot of people", highlighting his collaborations with composer Manuel Alejandro, also added that "the best homage is to keep remembering him and listening to his songs".

On 4 October, a funeral for José was held in Miami which was exclusively for family and friends and José was finally cremated on 8 October. Also on 8 October, his death certificate was revealed and his ashes were divided; with a portion of his ashes staying in Miami, while the remainder of his ashes were flown back to Mexico.

On 9 October, half of his ashes were flown back to Mexico City aboard a Mexican Air Force military plane early in the day. A black hearse picked up the gold plated casket bearing his ashes at the airport and drove to the city's downtown where admirers tossed flowers and waved to the passing vehicle as it made its way to the Palace of Fine Arts. A three-hour long tribute was held at the Fine Arts Palace planned  by the Mexican Culture Ministry with members of the National Symphony Orchestra played renditions of some of the icon's ballad songs including "El Triste". Artists from Mexico's the Opera Studio of Fine Arts and the Saloma Quartet also honored the singer's musical legacy during the ceremony. One of the surprises of the day was the visit of Emmanuel. Dulce and Lucia Mendez arrived together at the tribute, where they also stood guard for the coffin. Jorge Ortiz de Pinedo, was another of the people invited to say goodbye to the prince of the song. The ashes were then taken to the Basilica of Our Lady of Guadalupe for a mass, after the family led a funeral procession through the singer's former neighborhood. The ashes were interred at the Panteón Francés de San Joaquín located in Mexico City.

Artistry and image

José grew up listening to traditional pop music, rock and roll, jazz, swing, and big band. He listened to performers such as Elvis Presley, Frank Sinatra, Johnny Mathis and such popular Mexican composers as Consuelo Velázquez and María Grever. He was later inspired by vocalist Barbra Streisand, whom he considered an influence. The son of an operatic tenor and a pianist, he grew up listening to composers such as Chopin and Mozart, but never got the chance to play classical music. In his teens, José learned to play music from top Mexican jazz players and is recognized for playing several instruments, such as the piano, bass, guitar and double bass. Because of his phrasing ability, he was once described as "a singer who sings as a musician". His musical preferences were classical musicians such as Ravel, Debussy and Musorgsky, jazz, and bossa nova.

Vocals
According to his autobiography, Ésta es mi vida, vocal coach Guido Picco described José José as a light lyric tenor. José worked for periods with coach Seth Riggs, who later highlighted his vocal abilities. Over time, his voice and vocal style changed noticeably, being his prime the early 1970s. Inheriting the singing qualities of his father, he was able to reach high and low notes easily with a practically flawless intonation. His live performance of "El Triste" in 1970 has been widely praised by many critics for its technique and intensity. His breathing technique allowed him to sustain long and clear notes.

After recording the song "El Triste" for the 2010 album Iconos, singer Marc Anthony said, "once you start to sing it you realize the magnitude, of that spectacular voice and special phrasing of José José and his incredible way to perform". On the Latin VH1 show Las 100 grandiosas canciones de los 1980s en español (The 100 Greatest Spanish Songs of the 1980s), singer Diego Verdaguer said: "If today he could sing, he would be the greatest of Latin America."  In a 2018 interview, singer Lupita D'Alessio stated "[José] is an icon, the master, the creator of phrasing, he's got a way of phrasing that there will not be another, for me, he is the greatest singer ever, with the pardon of Luis Miguel". D'Alessio also highlighted his technique to breathe and sustain long notes.

Legacy
The music of José José is widely known in the Hispanic community. Many artists have acknowledged José as an influence, including Cristian Castro, Vicente Fernández, Alejandro Fernández, Nelson Ned, Pepe Aguilar, Kalimba, Erik Rubin, Manuel Mijares, Lupita D'Alessio, Diego Verdaguer, Reyli, Chayanne and Marc Anthony.

In 1997, José was inducted into Billboard Latin Music Hall of Fame. He received the Billboard Latin Music Lifetime Achievement Award in 2013.

In 2002, José José was awarded the Excellence Award at the 14th Annual Lo Nuestro Awards and was inducted into the International Latin Music Hall of Fame. In 2004, he received the Latin Grammy Lifetime Achievement Award. A year later he received the Personalidad del Año (Person of the Year) by the Latin Recording Academy.

In 2006, Televisa produced a TV homage to José José in Acapulco, where singers such as Manoella Torres, Francisco Céspedes, and Gualberto Castro performed several of his greatest hits live. 

In July 2008, Univision and the Latin Grammy recorded a special TV tribute in Miami to José José, called Latin Grammy Celebra: José José (Latin Grammy Celebrates: José José) at the BankUnited Center. Stars such as Marco Antonio Solís, Ana Bárbara, Alicia Villarreal, Olga Tañon, Luis Fonsi, David Bisbal, and Aventura performed some of his greatest hits live. Stars such as Plácido Domingo, Ricky Martin, Enrique Iglesias, Pepe Aguilar, Pedro Fernández, and RBD, showed their admiration with messages and greetings. Univision described José José as "One of the most beloved singers in Latin music."

In 2007, a bronze statue was unveiled in his honor in the Azcapotzalco area in Mexico City, where he grew up. He was honored by the Las Vegas Walk of Stars with a celebrity star and a book signing at the Rio in Las Vegas on 20 November 2008.

In February 2004, for his contribution to the recording industry, José José received a star on the Hollywood Walk of Fame at 7036 Hollywood Blvd. He was posthumously given the Living Legend Award by the Latin Songwriters Hall of Fame in 2019.

Tributes
Latin rock and hip hop artists such as Molotov, Jumbo, Julieta Venegas, Beto Cuevas, and Aleks Syntek recorded a tribute album in 1998 called Volcán: Tributo a José José (Volcán: Tribute to José José). Each artist recorded one of José's classics such as "Lo Dudo", "El Triste", or "Volcán" in a distinctive fashion. It sold over 500,000 units. Fifteen years after its release, in November 2013, a follow-up to Volcán: Tributo a José José was released under the title Un Tributo 2, featuring performers such as Natalia Lafourcade, Moderatto, Los Claxons, Carla Morrison, and Panteón Rococó.

On 30 November 2010, Mexican singer Cristian Castro released Viva el Principe (Long Live the Prince) which includes a virtual duet with José José on "Lo Pasado, Pasado" and a poem recited by him. In the poem, José conveys that the singer cannot live if he cannot sing ("Ya no podrá vivir, si ya no canta"); an allusion to losing his singing voice. Rafael Pérez-Botija was involved in the production of the album. The success of Viva el Principe helped revive Castro's career. Castro released another tribute album to José José titled Mi Amigo El Príncipe (My friend the Prince).

In 2009,  Kalimba recorded an album, Amar y Querer: Homenaje A Las Grandes Canciones (Love and Desire: A Tribute to the Great Songs), which featured some of the most iconic Latin ballads, among them: "Amar y querer", "Desesperado", "Volcán", and "El Triste".

On 25 October 2019, 100,000 people paid homage to José during a rainstorm in the Zócalo of Mexico City.

Filmography

Selected discography

References

External links

 
 José José on YouTube
 José José on Grammy Awards

1948 births
2019 deaths
Bossa nova musicians
Bossa nova singers
Deaths from pancreatic cancer
Deaths from cancer in Florida
Hispanic and Latino American male actors
Latin Grammy Lifetime Achievement Award winners
Latin Recording Academy Person of the Year honorees
Latin pop singers
Male actors from Mexico City
Male jazz musicians
Mexican jazz musicians
Mexican male film actors
Mexican people of Spanish descent
Musicians from Mexico City
Singers from Mexico City
20th-century Mexican male actors
20th-century Mexican male singers
21st-century Mexican male singers
Burials in Mexico
Mexican Roman Catholics